Nathanael (Hebrew נתנאל, "God has given"), also known as  Nathaniel of Cana was a disciple of Jesus, mentioned only in Chapters 1 and 21 of the Gospel of John.

History
In the Gospel of John, Nathanael is introduced as a friend of Philip, from Bethsaida (1:43-44). The first disciples who follow Jesus are portrayed as reaching out immediately to family or friends: thus, Philip found Nathanael and said to him, “We have found Him of whom Moses in the law, and also the prophets, wrote — Jesus of Nazareth, the son of Joseph”.

Nathanael is described as initially being skeptical about whether the Messiah could come from Nazareth, saying: "Can anything good come out of Nazareth?", but nonetheless, he accepts Philip's invitation to find out. Jesus immediately characterizes him as "an Israelite in whom is no deceit". Some scholars hold that Jesus' quote "Before Philip called you, when you were under the fig tree, I saw you", is based on a Jewish figure of speech, referring to studying the Torah. Nathanael recognizes Jesus as "the Son of God" and "the King of Israel".

He reappears (as "Nathanael of Cana") at the end of John's Gospel, as one of the disciples to whom Jesus appeared at the Sea of Galilee after the Resurrection.

References

Twelve Apostles
Gospel of John
People from Bethsaida